Michael Lynn Parson (born September 17, 1955) is an American politician serving as the 57th governor of Missouri since 2018. A member of the Republican Party, Parson assumed the governorship when Eric Greitens resigned, as he was lieutenant governor at the time. Parson served the remainder of Greitens's term and was elected governor in his own right in 2020.

Parson served in the Missouri House of Representatives from 2005 to 2011 and the Missouri Senate from 2011 to 2017. He was elected lieutenant governor in 2016. He assumed the governorship on June 1, 2018, upon Greitens's resignation. As governor, Parson has signed a bill criminalizing abortion after eight weeks of pregnancy and opposed Medicaid expansion. He oversaw the state's response to the COVID-19 pandemic, issuing a temporary stay-at-home order in April 2020 but allowing schools districts to decide whether to close. Parson placed restrictions on mail-in voting during the 2020 U.S. elections, and oversaw Missouri's reaction to the George Floyd protests.

Early life, education, and career

Michael Lynn Parson was born on September 17, 1955, in Wheatland, Missouri, and raised on a farm in Hickory County. He graduated from Wheatland High School in 1973.

Parson enlisted in the United States Army in 1975, and served six years in the Military Police Corps, discharged in 1981 at the rank of sergeant. While in the Army, he attended night classes at the University of Maryland and the University of Hawaiʻi, without completing a degree.

Parson returned to Hickory County in 1981 to serve as a sheriff's deputy and transferred to the Polk County Sheriff's Office to become its first criminal investigator in 1983. He served as Polk County sheriff from 1993 to 2004.

In 1984, Parson purchased a gas station and named it Mike's. He eventually owned and operated three gas stations in the area.

Missouri General Assembly

Parson was first elected to the 133rd District in the Missouri House of Representatives in 2004. He was reelected in 2006 and 2008. In 2007, Parson co-sponsored a bill to expand castle doctrine rights.

In 2010, Parson was elected to the Missouri Senate. He had signed the Americans for Tax Reform pledge not to raise any taxes. He served as the Senate majority whip during the 96th General Assembly. He was reelected in 2014, running unopposed in both the primary and general election.

Lieutenant governor of Missouri

Campaign
Parson initially announced he would run for governor in 2016, but opted to run for lieutenant governor instead. After defeating two opponents in the Republican primaries, he faced Democratic former U.S. Representative Russ Carnahan, whom he defeated in the general election on November 8, 2016.

During his campaign, Parson was criticized by his former chief of staff for allegedly proposing legislation on behalf of a lobbyist and a $50,000 plan to employ a valet for his vehicle. Parson claimed his former staffer was a "disgruntled former employee".

Tenure
Parson was sworn in along with Governor Eric Greitens on January 9, 2017. Noting that the lieutenant governor's office had not been upgraded in the past 12 years, Parson approved $54,000 in remodeling and renovation costs during his first two months in office.

In 2017, Parson sought a $125,000 increase to his $463,000 budget, which included $35,000 to reimburse him for travel mileage during state business. He also sought $10,000 for out-of-state travel. In 2018 he asked for an additional $25,000 to pay for a part-time personal driver but decreased his overall budget request to $541,000. In response to criticism, his office routinely stated that his office and salary was the smallest of any statewide elected Missouri official's.

Parson was the only statewide elected official to accept gifts from a lobbyist in his first six months in office, reporting $2,752 in meals and gifts. Parson's predecessor, Peter Kinder, also accepted gifts.

After allegations of improper care at the Missouri Veterans Home in St. Louis, first reported by the St. Louis Post-Dispatch in October 2017, Parson's office launched an investigation.

On February 22, 2018, Greitens was indicted on felony invasion of privacy charges. The indictment came a month after he disclosed an extramarital affair, which only increased speculation that Parson could succeed Greitens should he step aside or be removed.

Low-income housing tax credit industry
On December 19, 2017, Parson voted to keep a $140 million state tax credit intended for developers of low-income housing. Greitens had appointed members to the Missouri Housing Development Commission who opposed the Low-Income Housing Tax Credit (LIHTC) program, and had publicly called the program "a special interest scheme that makes insiders rich." Parson and then-state treasurer Eric Schmitt were the only members to vote to keep the tax credit. Before the commission's vote, Greitens had publicly opposed the tax credit, after a bipartisan audit of the program showed that only 42 cents of every dollar were being spent on low-income housing. The Columbia Tribune reported in 2017 that Parson and Schmitt were "among the top 10 Republican recipients developer contributions over the past 10 years."

Governor of Missouri

On May 29, 2018, Greitens announced that he would resign effective at 5:00 pm on June 1, 2018. Parson was sworn in as governor half an hour later.

National endorsements
Parson endorsed Mitt Romney in the 2012 presidential election and Donald Trump in the 2016 presidential election.

Appointments
In June 2018, Parson appointed Missouri Senate Majority Leader Mike Kehoe lieutenant governor. The appointment came with legal uncertainty, as the Constitution of Missouri states that "The governor shall fill all vacancies in public offices unless otherwise provided by law" but a Missouri law stated that the governor can fill all vacancies "other than in the offices of lieutenant governor, state senator or representative, sheriff, or recorder of deeds in the city of St. Louis." The Missouri Democratic Party challenged the appointment in court; in 2019, the Missouri Supreme Court ruled, in a 5–2 decision, that Parson had the legal authority to make the appointment.

Parson appointed Robin Ransom to the Supreme Court of Missouri; she is the first African-American woman to serve on the Court.

In 2022, the Missouri Senate adjourned without considering the nomination of Donald Kauerauf as director of the Missouri Department of Health and Senior Services, effectively ousting him from that post. Some Senate Republicans had opposed Kauerauf's nomination because Kauerauf supports efforts to encourage Missourians to get vaccinated against COVID-19. In defending Kauerauf, Parson said he "would not have nominated someone who does not share the same Christian values" he holds. Parson's statement was criticized by many, including the Americans United for Separation of Church and State, interfaith groups, and State Representative Adam Schwadron (a Jewish Republican who pointed to the No Religious Test Clause of the U.S. Constitution). After receiving blowback, Parson's spokesperson said the governor had no "litmus test for appointments".

2020 election

After filing to run for his first full term in the 2020 gubernatorial election, Parson, when asked if he would plan to run for another term in 2024, said, "I don't see that in my future." Amid rumors that Greitens would run for governor again in 2020, Parson's team said they doubted Greitens would consider another gubernatorial run. The chairman of Parson's political action committee released a poll to see whether voters would vote for Greitens or Parson in a Republican primary election; the chairman then said, "I don't expect [Greitens] to run."

After denying implementation of voting by mail in Missouri, when asked about voters who have concerns about going to a polling place amid the COVID-19 pandemic, Parson said such people should not vote.

Parson defeated state representative Jim Neely and Air Force veteran Saundra McDowell in the Republican primary on August 4, 2020. He then defeated Democratic nominee State Auditor Nicole Galloway in the November 3 general election.

Tenure
In December 2018, Parson proposed repealing a voter-approved constitutional amendment to establish nonpartisan redistricting of state House and Senate districts. The Associated Press estimated that a nonpartisan redrawing of districts would likely increase Democrats' share of state House and Senate seats. At the same time, Parson expressed support for making it harder to put issues up for ballot referendum.

Abortion
On May 24, 2019, Parson signed bill HB 126, known as the Missouri Stands for the Unborn Act, criminalizing abortions in Missouri after eight weeks of pregnancy. Under the law, anyone who performs an abortion after eight weeks could be charged with a Class B felony punishable by 5 to 15 years in prison. The bill, passed in both General Assembly chambers the week before after debate and protest, has no exceptions for victims of rape or incest, but does have an exclusion for medical emergencies. A federal judge blocked the law a day before it was to go into effect, but left an exception for the "reason ban" portion of the bill prohibiting abortions on the basis of race, sex, or diagnosis of Down Syndrome.

In October 2021, the Parson administration added a new rule that would allow state agencies to share health inspection reports about abortion providers with one another, which could make it easier for the state to withhold Medicaid funding from abortion providers.

COVID-19 pandemic

As of March 13, 2020, Parson had announced the first two known cases of COVID-19 in Missouri: one in St. Louis and one in Springfield, with both in self-quarantine. Parson said his administration had received $13 million in federal aid to combat the COVID-19 pandemic, and that of every test taken for the virus, only those two were positive. He said the virus was not spreading in Missouri. On March 17, he announced that Missouri had 15 confirmed cases. Parson said the state would expand to 10,000 tests per day by April 1 and would look into more protective measures for law enforcement and firefighters. He said that his declaration of a state of emergency in Missouri freed $7 million in funding to fight the virus. Despite the virus's contagiousness, Parson delegated the decision to close schools to school districts. After similar actions by Kansas Governor Laura Kelly, Parson announced that, effective 12:00 a.m. March 17, all Missouri casinos would close. He made this announcement after consulting the chair of the Missouri Gaming Commission. On March 21, Parson announced a new response plan to the pandemic, including a ban on gatherings of more than 10 people. The plan was set to go into effect at midnight on March 23 and end at midnight on April 6. The plan also banned dining in restaurants, allowing only takeout and drive-through.

After declining to close down Missouri, and rejecting demands from across the nation and the statewide health industry, while more than 1,500 new cases of COVID-19 had been confirmed in Missouri – one of ten states to remain open during the growing pandemic – and after St. Louis and Kansas City issued strict stay-at-home orders, Parson issued a general statewide stay-at-home order on April 3 to take effect three days later. The order was later extended to expire May 3, mirroring a similar extension by Kansas Governor Kelly. Parson simultaneously issued a statewide order closing public schools until the beginning of the new school year in the fall. Once the order expired, he delegated responsibility to the counties for enforcing social distancing as the state reopened, comparing the situation to local health departments monitoring restaurants.

In May 2020, Parson and four other Republican governors published an editorial in The Washington Post titled "Our states stayed open in the COVID-19 pandemic. Here's why our approach worked", though unlike the other signatories, Parson had initially supported a shutdown. In July 2020, Parson argued for the reopening of schools. He said schoolchildren "are at the lowest risk possible. And if they do get COVID-19, which they will—and they will when they go to school—they're not going to the hospitals [...] They're going to go home and they're going to get over it." He also strongly opposed mandating the wearing of face masks.

On September 23, 2020, Parson and his wife Teresa both tested positive for COVID-19, and they both announced "mild symptoms". In October 2020, Parson announced that he and his wife had both "fully recovered".

In January 2021, Parson called up the Missouri National Guard to assist with the vaccination efforts, though he said that "Supply [of the vaccine] remains extremely limited."

In February 2021, a report by Deloitte commissioned by the state found expanding "vaccine deserts" in the Kansas City and St. Louis metropolitan areas. That same month, Missouri was ranked last out of all states in COVID-19 vaccine distribution, which Parson said would be "a struggle for months to come." The St. Louis Post-Dispatch reported that the St. Louis region was receiving less than half of the vaccinations that it should based on population, despite increased prevalence of COVID-19 in urban areas. In response, Mayor of St. Louis Lyda Krewson sent Parson and Director of the Missouri Department of Health and Senior Services Randall W. Williams a letter expressing her concern that the city would become "a COVID-19 vaccine desert". In response to the reports, Parson doubled down, attacking the report and Alex Garza, the head of the St. Louis Metropolitan Pandemic Task Force, who he said had cherry-picked data and was "spreading information, false information about the vaccine administration in the St. Louis area to once more spread fear and panic."

On June 15, 2021, Parson signed into law a bill banning "COVID-19 passports" and reducing local leaders' ability to make public health orders. The law limits orders made by local health agencies to 30 days, at which time an extension would require a declaration of emergency by the governor or, barring that, a two-thirds vote by the local governing board.

In July 2021, Parson announced a new statewide Vaccine Incentive Program, giving Missourians who received a COVID-19 vaccine a chance to win up to $10,000. As of September 2021, 550,000 doses of COVID vaccine had been administered since the start of the program.

In early November 2021, the Missouri Department of Health concluded a study on the effectiveness of mask mandates at the request of Parson, who has a history of criticizing local mask mandates. The study found that mask mandates reduced COVID-19 infections and deaths. Its results were not released publicly by the health department or included in Parson's cabinet meeting material. The information became publicly known in early December 2021 after a Missouri Independent Sunshine Law request. Parson subsequently argued that the study was wrong and his office said that the Department of Health had put "no time or research" into the analysis.

In November 2021, as a result of the Omicron variant of COVID-19, Parson decided to postpone a scheduled trade mission to Israel and Greece.

Gun law
On June 14, 2021, Parson signed a bill banning local police departments from enforcing federal gun legislation, allowing those that do to be sued and fined $50,000. He signed the bill at a gun shop and shooting range. Two days later, the U.S. Department of Justice sent Parson a letter saying the law violated the Supremacy Clause, and O'Fallon, Missouri police chief Philip Dupuis resigned over the law, which he said would "decrease public safety and increase frivolous lawsuits designed to harass and penalize good hard-working law enforcement agencies". Democrats criticized the law, calling it unconstitutional. In response, Parson and Eric Schmitt contended that "Missouri is not attempting to nullify federal law".

The City of St. Louis, St. Louis County, and Jackson County sued the state, seeking to block the law. In February 2022, the U.S. Department of Justice also sued the state, arguing that the law unconstitutionally attempts to supersede federal law. On March 7, 2023, Federal District Court Judge Brian C. Wimes found that state law unconstitutional as a violation of the Supremacy Clause. Missouri Attorney General Andrew Bailey said he would challenge the decision and U.S. Representative Eric Burlison denigrated the decision as understandable because Wimes was appointed by President Barack Obama. Disappointed with Bailey's action, Kansas City Mayor Quinton Lucas said that Missouri officials had hoped that Bailey "would approach the office like a grown-up".

Low-income housing
After Greitens's resignation, Parson initially said that as governor he had no plans to restart the low-income tax credit. Parson has since appointed Lieutenant Governor Mike Kehoe, State Treasurer Scott Fitzpatrick, and Attorney General Eric Schmitt, all members of the commission. In May 2019, Parson announced his intention to restart the low income housing tax credit program. He also announced that he was considering calling a legislative special session to restart the program.

Medicaid expansion
Parson opposed the 2020 Missouri ballot referendum on Medicaid expansion, which would cost the state at least $130 million annually to receive $1.6 billion in federal funds. He argued that the referendum's lack of funding mechanism would harm the state budget, but promised to obey the vote results. In August 2020, after a decade of advocacy, Missouri voters approved the referendum to become the 37th state with Medicaid expansion effective July 1, 2021. 

Regardless, on May 13, 2021, Parson declared denial of expansion, again blaming funding, so that the enhanced services and the 275,000 newly eligible citizens would not receive coverage. With the issue headed to court, and some state representatives claiming the state had more than enough funding, The Kansas City Star wrote, "The governor's directive was swiftly condemned as an anti-democratic dismissal of the will of the people." In July 2021, the Missouri Supreme Court settled the issue by ruling that the referendum did not violate state law, thus paving the way for expansion.

Pardons
Before his 2020 reelection, Parson issued very few pardons, but since then, he has begun issuing them monthly. As of June 2021, he had a backlog of about 3,000 requests for clemency.

In July 2020, Parson proactively pledged to pardon Mark and Patricia McCloskey, a St. Louis couple who pointed guns at unarmed George Floyd protesters walking past their home on a private street, if they were convicted of crimes and if there was no significant change in the facts as they were understood at the time. In August 2021, he pardoned the McCloskeys after they pleaded guilty to misdemeanor fourth-degree assault and misdemeanor harassment.

In June 2021, Parson declined to pardon Kevin Strickland, an African-American man imprisoned for triple murder since 1978, saying it was not a "priority". Strickland, who had been convicted by an all-white jury, had maintained his innocence, and the case's prosecutor said she believes him to be innocent. He had become the subject of a bipartisan clemency petition by state lawmakers, and several judges and other politicians had called for his release. In November 2021, a judge set aside the conviction and Strickland was released. Parson also refused to pardon Lamar Johnson, an African-American man convicted for murder on the basis of one eyewitness's testimony; a conviction integrity unit later found that there was overwhelming evidence of his innocence. Critics contrasted Parson's decision to decline to pardon Strickland with his decision to pardon the McCloskeys.

Threat to prosecute St. Louis Post-Dispatch reporter
On October 14, 2021, the St. Louis Post-Dispatch reported that a flaw on a Missouri Department of Elementary and Secondary Education (DESE) website exposed the Social Security numbers (SSNs) of over 100,000 DESE administrators, counselors, and teachers by embedding them in the website's public source code. The Post-Dispatch notified DESE of the flaw and delayed the publication of its story "to give the department time to take steps to protect teachers' private information, and to allow the state to ensure no other agencies' web applications contained similar vulnerabilities." DESE initially wanted to thank the Post-Dispatch for bringing the vulnerability to light. Instead, Parson announced that the Missouri State Highway Patrol would investigate "all of those involved"; vowed to seek criminal prosecution of the journalist who reported the story, Josh Renaud (calling him a "hacker"); and said his administration would prosecute "any and all perpetrators who attempt to steal personal information and harm Missourians." Parson claimed Renaud wanted to "embarrass the state and sell headlines for their news outlet"; called his reporting a "crime against Missouri teachers"; and pledged to prosecute "all those who aided this individual and the media corporation that employs them."

In February 2022, the Missouri State Highway Patrol released a 158-page report, concluding (after 175 hours of investigation) that Renaud had accessed only publicly available information and had committed no wrongdoing, and the Cole County Prosecuting Attorney brought no charges. DESE officials, as well as the State Highway Patrol investigation, determined that the flaw in the DESE website that publicly exposed the SSNs of 576,000 teachers had been in place for a decade (since 2011) until it was fixed after Renaud's reporting. A DESE official said that the website with the vulnerability had been "developed and maintained by the Office of Administration's Information Technology Services Division (ITSD)—which the governor's office controls directly." The report vindicated Renaud and University of Missouri-St. Louis professor Shaji Khan, who helped confirm the existence of the security lapse for the Post-Dispatch and was also a target of Parson's prosecution threat.

State and federal legislators, including State Representative Tony Lovasco and U.S. Senator Ron Wyden, criticized Parson's response, with Lovasco tweeting that "the governor's office has a fundamental misunderstanding of both web technology and industry-standard procedures for reporting security vulnerabilities." The National Press Club called Parson's targeting of Renaud a "particularly egregious" example of public officials who attacked the press, and honored Renaud with the Club's 2022 John Aubuchon Press Freedom Award.

Personal life

Parson married his wife, Teresa, in 1985. They have two children. During Parson's term as governor, the couple has lived at the Missouri Governor's Mansion in Jefferson City, except for several months in 2019 when the mansion was undergoing renovations. The couple's personal residence is in Bolivar.

A third-generation farmer, Parson started a cow and calf operation near Bolivar in 1985, which he still owns and operates.

Parson is a Baptist.

Electoral history

State Representative

 Unopposed for the primary and general elections in District 133 in 2006 and 2008.

State Senator

 Unopposed for the 28th District seat in 2014

Lieutenant Governor

Governor

References

External links

Office of Missouri Governor
Mike Parson for Governor

|-

|-

|-

|-

|-

|-

|-

|-

|-

1955 births
Living people
20th-century American politicians
21st-century American politicians
American military police officers
Republican Party governors of Missouri
Lieutenant Governors of Missouri
Republican Party members of the Missouri House of Representatives
Military personnel from Missouri
Missouri sheriffs
Republican Party Missouri state senators
People from Clinton, Missouri
People from Hickory County, Missouri
People from Polk County, Missouri
United States Army non-commissioned officers
University of Hawaiʻi at Mānoa alumni
University of Maryland, College Park alumni